Two Japanese destroyers have been named :

 , lead ship of her class that served the Imperial Japanese Navy
 Tachibana-class destroyer, a class of destroyer built for the Imperial Japanese Navy during World War II

See also 
 Tachibana (disambiguation)

Imperial Japanese Navy ship names
Japanese Navy ship names